Vladan Kujović (Serbian Cyrillic: Владан Кујовић; born 23 August 1978) is a Serbian professional footballer who plays as a goalkeeper and also works as a goalkeeper coach for MVV Maastricht.

Career
Having already made his senior debut for his hometown club Sinđelić Niš, Kujović moved abroad at an early age and signed for Belgian side Eendracht Aalst in 1997. He spent the next five seasons at the club, before transferring to Dutch side Roda JC in 2002. After playing for five years in the Netherlands, Kujović moved to La Liga club Levante in 2007. He spent just one season in Spain, before returning to Belgium and signing for Lierse. In early 2011, Kujović switched to Dutch side Willem II. He subsequently joined Club Brugge and stayed there until his retirement in 2015.

Internationally, Kujović was capped for FR Yugoslavia at under-18 and under-21 level.

Coaching career
On 8 July 2019 MVV Maastricht announced, that Kujović had joined the club as a goalkeeper coach. However, Kujović was also registered as a player and become the third choice, after MVV-keeper, Lars Van Meurs, got seriously injured while playing with his dog.

Honours
Club Brugge
 Belgian Cup: 2014–15

References

External links
 
 
 
 

Association football goalkeepers
Belgian Pro League players
Challenger Pro League players
Club Brugge KV players
Eredivisie players
Expatriate footballers in Belgium
Expatriate footballers in Spain
Expatriate footballers in the Netherlands
FK Sinđelić Niš players
La Liga players
Levante UD footballers
Lierse S.K. players
S.C. Eendracht Aalst players
MVV Maastricht players
MVV Maastricht non-playing staff
Serbia and Montenegro under-21 international footballers
Serbian expatriate footballers
Serbian expatriate sportspeople in Belgium
Serbian expatriate sportspeople in Spain
Serbian expatriate sportspeople in the Netherlands
Serbian footballers
Sportspeople from Niš
Willem II (football club) players
1978 births
Living people